The 1977 All-Ireland Senior Football Championship Final was the ninetieth All-Ireland Final and the deciding match of the 1977 All-Ireland Senior Football Championship, an inter-county Gaelic football tournament for the top teams in Ireland. The game was contested by Armagh and Dublin. Dublin retained the Sam Maguire Cup.

This was Armagh's second ever All-Ireland final. Their previous appearance was in 1953. Dublin had appeared in the previous three finals, winning two of those (1974 and 1976).

Jimmy Smyth captained Armagh.

Jimmy Keaveney scored 2–6, which was the amount Dublin won by. This final's eight goals is joint most scored in a final, a record shared with the 1948 match.

Joe Kernan scored two of Armagh's goals.

An early goal by Keaveney and Dublin led by 3-6 to 1-3 at half-time and by 4–8 to 1–3 at one point in the second half before the two Kernan goals; in 2022, Martin Breheny listed it among "five of the worst" All-Ireland SFC finals since 1972.

Armagh would not return to an All-Ireland football decider until 2002.

References

All-Ireland Senior Football Championship Final
All-Ireland Senior Football Championship Final
All-Ireland Senior Football Championship Final, 1977
All-Ireland Senior Football Championship Finals
All-Ireland Senior Football Championship Finals
Armagh county football team matches
Dublin county football team matches